Martyn C. Cowan FRHistS is an Irish Presbyterian minister and lecturer in Historical Theology at the Union Theological College, Belfast.

Biography

Early life and education 
Cowan was educated at Friends' School Lisburn and went on to study philosophy at undergraduate and postgraduate level at Queen’s University Belfast. He was a student on the Cornhill Training Course and trained for ordination at Oak Hill Theological College (MTh Distinction), and Union Theological College (PG Cert Min). He subsequently completed doctoral studies at the University of Cambridge with a dissertation entitled ’The prophetic preaching of John Owen from 1646 to 1659 in its historical context'.

Ministry 
He served as Assistant Minister in First Presbyterian Church, Saintfield, and Assistant to the Vacancy Convener in First Presbyterian Church, Portadown. He was appointed Lecturer in Historical Theology at Union College in June 2016 and ordained in December 2016.

Research 
In 2018 he was elected as a Fellow of the Royal Historical Society. Cowan's work on the preaching of John Owen is part of a new scholarly turn in Owen studies.

Publications 

 Review of John Owen and English Puritanism: Experiences of Defeat, by Crawford Gribben, Themelios 43.1 (2018): http://themelios.thegospelcoalition.org/review/john-owen-and-english-puritanism-experiences-of-defeat
 ‘The Reformation: Justification by fate alone’, The Irish Times, 17 Oct 2017. https://www.irishtimes.com/opinion/the-reformation-justification-by-fate-alone-1.3257640
 John Owen and the Civil War Apocalypse: Preaching, Prophecy and Politics (Routledge, 2017). .
 Portrait of a Prophet: Lessons from the Preaching of John Owen (1616–1683) (St Antholin Charity Lectureship, Latimer Trust, 2016)   
 ‘Introduction to the Old Testament Historical Books’ in NIV Proclamation Bible: Correctly Handling the Word of Truth (Hodder & Stoughton, 2013).  
 ‘New World, New Temple, New Worship: The Book of Revelation in the Theology and Practice of Christian Worship’, published in three parts: Churchman 119.4 (Winter 2005), 297–312; Churchman 120.2 (Summer 2006), 159–176; Churchman 120.3 (Autumn 2006), 247–265.

References

External links 
 Faculty Profile
 Routledge Featured Author Page

Year of birth missing (living people)
Living people
Alumni of Oak Hill College
Alumni of Queen's University Belfast
Academics of Union Theological College, Belfast
People educated at Friends' School, Lisburn
Presbyterian ministers from Northern Ireland